William Henry Quick (15 October 1843 – 13 September 1911) was a New Zealand businessman, politician, and solicitor. He was born in Sierra Leone, and received education at Horton College in Ross, Tasmania. His father, Rev W. A. Quick, was afterwards president there. Quick became a solicitor in 1866, and then came immediately to New Zealand. He was a member of the Wellington City Council for the Lambton Ward from 1884–1887.

Career
He practiced as a solicitor first in Whanganui before doing so in Wellington. From 1906 to 1911 he was a director of the Bank of New Zealand.

Later life
Quick died on 13 September 1911 aged 67, outlived by his father who died later in 1915 as the oldest Methodist minister in the entire world.

References 

1843 births
1911 deaths
New Zealand businesspeople
Wellington City Councillors
Bank of New Zealand
Sierra Leonean emigrants to New Zealand